The 1983 Grambling State Tigers football team represented Grambling State University as a member of the Southwestern Athletic Conference (SWAC) during the 1983 NCAA Division I-AA football season. Led by 41st-year head coach Eddie Robinson, the Tigers compiled an overall record of 8–1–2 and a mark of 6–0–1 in conference play, and won the SWAC championship. The Tigers won a black college football national championship.

Schedule

References

Grambling State
Grambling State Tigers football seasons
Black college football national champions
Southwestern Athletic Conference football champion seasons
Grambling State Tigers football